Papua New Guinea competed at the 1984 Summer Olympics in Los Angeles, United States.  The nation returned to the Olympic Games after participating in the American-led boycott of the 1980 Summer Olympics.

Results by event

Athletics
Men's 400 metres
Lapule Tamean
 Heat — 47.60 (→ did not advance)

Men's 5,000 metres 
 John Tau
 Heat — 15:24.68 (→ did not advance)

Men's 10,000 metres
 John Tau
 Heat — 31:29.14 (→ did not advance)

Men's Marathon
 John Tau — 2:36:36 (→ 66th place)

Women's Javelin Throw 
 Iammogapi Launa
 Qualification — did not start (→ did not advance)

Women's Heptathlon
 Iammogapi Launa
 Final Result — 5148 points (→ 19th place)

See also
 Papua New Guinea at the 1984 Summer Paralympics

References
Official Olympic Reports

Nations at the 1984 Summer Olympics
1984
1984 in Papua New Guinean sport